West of the Rio Grande is a 1944 American Western film directed by Lambert Hillyer. This is the tenth film in the "Marshal Nevada Jack McKenzie" series, and stars Johnny Mack Brown as Jack McKenzie and Raymond Hatton as his sidekick Sandy Hopkins, with Dennis Moore, Christine McIntyre and Lloyd Ingraham. It was released on May 22, 1938.

Cast list
 Johnny Mack Brown as Nevada McKenzie
 Raymond Hatton as Sandy Hopkins
 Dennis Moore as Denny Boyd
 Christine McIntyre as Alice Darcy
 Lloyd Ingraham as Trooper Meade
 Kenneth MacDonald as Martin Keene
 Frank LaRue as Judge Darcy
 Art Fowler as Nate Todd
 Hugh Prosser as Lucky Cramer
 Edmund Cobb as Curly

See also
The Nevada Jack McKenzie series 
The Ghost Rider (1943)
The Stranger from Pecos (1943)
Six Gun Gospel (1943)
Outlaws of Stampede Pass (1943) 
The Texas Kid (1943) 
Raiders of the Border (1944) 
Partners of the Trail (1944) 
Law Men (1944) 
Range Law (1944) 
Land of the Outlaws (1944) 
Law of the Valley (1944) 
Ghost Guns (1944) 
The Navajo Trail (1945) 
Gun Smoke (1945) 
Stranger from Santa Fe (1945) 
The Lost Trail (1945) 
Frontier Feud (1945) 
Border Bandits (1946) 
The Haunted Mine (1946)

References

External links
 
 

American Western (genre) films
1944 Western (genre) films
1944 films
American black-and-white films
Films directed by Lambert Hillyer
1940s American films
1940s English-language films